Lady Jennifer may refer to:
 Lady Jennifer (novel), a 1908 novel by John Strange Winter
 Lady Jennifer (film), a 1915 film